Thiotricha tylephora is a moth of the family Gelechiidae. It was described by Edward Meyrick in 1935. It is found in Korea, Japan and Zhejiang, China.

References

Moths described in 1935
Thiotricha
Taxa named by Edward Meyrick